The 1941 Cleveland Rams season was the team's fifth year with the National Football League and the sixth season in Cleveland.

Schedule

Standings

References
1941 Cleveland Rams Season at Pro-Football Reference

Cleveland Rams
Cleveland Rams seasons
Cleveland Rams